Wesley Lewis Dennis (February 10, 1918 – March 6, 2001), nicknamed "Doc", was an American Negro league first baseman in the 1940s and 1950s. He played for the Philadelphia Stars, Baltimore Elite Giants, Nashville Stars and Birmingham Black Barons.

A native of Nashville, Tennessee, Dennis was named to the East's starting lineup in the East–West All-Star Game while playing for Birmingham in 1951, 1952 and 1953. An avid golfer in his later years, Dennis died in Nashville in 2001 at the age of 83.

References

External links
 and Seamheads
 Wesley Dennis at Negro Leagues Baseball Museum

1918 births
2001 deaths
Baltimore Elite Giants players
Birmingham Black Barons players
Nashville Stars players
Philadelphia Stars players
20th-century African-American sportspeople
Baseball infielders